Aphelele Mnyango, better known as Ma Nala, is a South African singer, songwriter born in Bhisho, Eastern Cape. Ma Nala comes from a musical family. Her late father, Zolisa "Senzol" Mnyango was one of the first DJs at Radio Ciskei and her older brother is acclaimed South African producer and artist Anatii. Ma Nala began her musical journey by studying music in Los Angeles, California, being mentored by Phillip Ingram.

The artist takes her moniker from her family's Xhosa clan name.

Discography

Singles

References

1994 births
Living people
People from Bhisho
Xhosa people
South African musicians